Muyiwa Odusanya (born 25 September 1967) is a Nigerian weightlifter. He competed in the men's light heavyweight event at the 1988 Summer Olympics.

References

1967 births
Living people
Nigerian male weightlifters
Olympic weightlifters of Nigeria
Weightlifters at the 1988 Summer Olympics
Place of birth missing (living people)
Commonwealth Games medallists in weightlifting
Commonwealth Games silver medallists for Nigeria
Commonwealth Games bronze medallists for Nigeria
Weightlifters at the 1990 Commonwealth Games
20th-century Nigerian people
Medallists at the 1990 Commonwealth Games